The 2011–12 season was Peterborough United's 51st season in the Football League, competing in the Football League Championship after being promoted from Football League One, beating Huddersfield Town 3–0 in the Play-off final.

Squad

Detailed overview

Friendly matches

Championship

Standings

Results summary

Results

League Cup

FA Cup

Player statistics

Appearances and goals

|-
|colspan="14"|Players featured for club who have left:

|}

Goalscorers

Disciplinary record

Penalties

Suspensions served

Transfers

In

 Total spending:  ~ £550,000+

Notes 1Although officially undisclosed, The Evening Telegraph reported the fee to be £300,000.

Loans in

Out

 Total income:  ~ £5,700,000+

Notes 
1Although officially undisclosed The Evening Telegraph reported the transfer fee was £2.5 million.

2Although officially undisclosed The Evening Telegraph reported the transfer fee was £3.2 million.

Loans outs

Contracts

Overall summary

Summary

Competition summary

References

2011-12
2011–12 Football League Championship by team